The Dangerous Moment is a 1921 American silent drama film directed by Marcel De Sano and starring Carmel Myers,Lule Warrenton and George Regas.

Cast
 Carmel Myers as Sylvia Palprini
 Lule Warrenton as Mrs. Tarkides
 George Regas as Movros Tarkides
 W.T. Fellows as Jack Reeve
 Billy Fay as Collins
 Bonnie Hill as Marjory Blake
 Herbert Heyes as George Duray
 Fred Becker as Henry Trent 
 Marian Skinner as Aunt Cynthia Grey
 Bowditch M. Turner as Trotsky

References

Bibliography
 Munden, Kenneth White. The American Film Institute Catalog of Motion Pictures Produced in the United States, Part 1. University of California Press, 1997.

External links
 

1921 films
1921 drama films
1920s English-language films
American silent feature films
Silent American drama films
American black-and-white films
Universal Pictures films
Films directed by Marcel De Sano
1920s American films